"Vo Kuznitse" ([]  In the Smithy) is a popular Russian folk song.

The song has been performed by many famous singers, e.g. by Lidia Ruslanova or by Leonid Smetannikov.

Synopsis
The young blacksmiths working in their forge try to attract the attention of a woman ( — simple folk girl or woman; or  — someone's daughter). The text is popularly misunderstood as being only about the exact woman named Dunya. They ask her to go with them into a forest to pluck a burdock leaf, promising to make a new dress for her that she needs to keep clean. The song also clearly has the sense of a parents-to-daughter moral tale which is often lost in translation.

Commentary

Historical background
According to some authors, the song could be heard during traditional Russian marriage celebrations. Nevertheless, either it was never regarded as a wedding song, or it eventually lost its ceremonial meaning.

The song became extremely popular in the Russian Empire, as well as in different parts of the Soviet Union.

Genre characteristics
Few sources consider song as a plyasovaya or a shutochnaya. It is mentioned as a khorovodnaya in various works on Russian musical folklore.

Settings
Many composers (including Yuri Shaporin, Anatoly Alexandrov, Serge Jaroff) arranged the song. In 1951 Nikolay Chaykin wrote his Concerto for Bayan and Orchestra No. 1; the final part of this composition contains a theme based on the melody of Vo Kuznitse.

References

External links
 

Vo Kuznitse by Lidia Ruslanova (Moscow, 1939).
Nikolay Chaykin's Concerto for Bayan and Orchestra No. 1 (3rd part).

Russian folk songs
Lidia Ruslanova songs
Songwriter unknown
Year of song unknown